SS Potsdam may refer to:

 , passenger steamer for Holland America Line, 1900–1915; Stockholm for Swedish American Line, 1915–1929; Norwegian whale factory ship Solglimt, 1929–1940; following German invasion of Norway, became Sonderburg for the First German Whaling Company, 1940; scuttled in Cherbourg harbor, 1944; completely cleared from channel and scrapped by 1947
 , passenger steamer for North German Lloyd, 1935–1946; later British troopship, Pakistani pilgrimage ship; scrapped 1976

Ship names